Guusje is a given name. Notable people with the given name include:

Guusje ter Horst (born 1952), Dutch politician and psychologist
Guusje Nederhorst (1969–2004), Dutch actress and singer
Guusje Steenhuis (born 1992), Dutch judoka
Guusje van Mourik (born 1955), Dutch karateka, judoka, and boxer
Guusje Ramakers (born 2008), Dutch superstar